The Black wolf is a melanistic color variant of the grey wolf (Canis lupus).

Black Wolf may also refer to:

Places
United States
 Black Wolf, Kansas, an unincorporated community
 Black Wolf, West Virginia
 Black Wolf (community), Wisconsin, an unincorporated community
 Black Wolf Point, Wisconsin, an unincorporated community
 Black Wolf Township, Ellsworth County, Kansas
 Black Wolf, Wisconsin, a town

Other
 Florida black wolf, an extinct subspecies of the red wolf Canis rufus
 Black Wolf (novel), a fantasy novel by Dave Gross
 The Black Wolf (film), a 1917 silent film drama
 The Black Wolf (novel), a 1979 horror novel by Galad Elflandsson